Nations Air was a new start up airline in the United States that began operating in 1995 that was established as Miami Air Charter in 1987 and ceased operations in 1999.

It was not related to a similarly-named airline based in Canada, Nationair, which had ceased operations prior to Nations Air's establishment.

History
Nations Air began as a passenger airline with three Boeing 737-200 jetliners. Scheduled services were operated between Pittsburgh, Philadelphia, Boston, and Myrtle Beach, South Carolina.  The airline quickly faced aggressive competition as well as safety questions that led the FAA to ground the airline briefly in July 1995. 

The demise of scheduled service for Nations Air occurred after the Valujet crash in the Florida Everglades created a huge backlash against small start-up carriers and the perception that they were unsafe from a standpoint of maintenance and training. Nations Air's CEO Mark McDonald discontinued scheduled service and, instead, used his 737s to service Atlantic City and Gulfport/Biloxi hotel and casino markets. 

Nations Air Express ceased operations on September 1, 1999.

Service in 1995
According to the December 1, 1995 Nations Air system timetable, scheduled service was being operated on a linear Boston (BOS)-Philadelphia (PHL)-Pittsburgh (PIT) routing with several flights being operated each day although none of these flights was operated on a daily basis.  Fares were as low as $39 one way BOS-PHL and PHL-PIT.

Service in 1999
According to the June 1, 1999 Official Airline Guide (OAG), the airline was flying scheduled nonstop service between Gulfport, MS (GPT) and Atlanta (ATL) four times a week.

Fleet
 2 Boeing 727-200 (N12304, N258US) leased from Pegasus Aviation
 4 Boeing 737-200 (N305VA, N308VA, N309VA, N737F)

See also 
 List of defunct airlines of the United States

References

Defunct airlines of the United States
Airlines established in 1995
Airlines disestablished in 1998